Social Studies of Science is a  bimonthly peer-reviewed academic journal that publishes papers relating to the history and philosophy of science. The journal's editors-in-chief are Nicole Nelson (University of Wisconsin-Madison) Sergio Sismondo (Queen's University). The journal was established in 1971 under the name Science Studies and assumed its present title in 1975. It is currently published by SAGE Publications.

Founding 
In the inaugural issue in 1971 the founding editors, Roy MacLeod and David Edge, announced that the journal "will devote itself to original research, whether empirical or theoretical, which brings fresh light to bear on the concepts, processes and consequences of modern science. It will be interdisciplinary in the sense that it will encourage appropriate contributions from political science, sociology, economics, history, philosophy, social anthropology, and the legal and educational
disciplines. It will welcome studies of fundamental research, applied research and development; of university science, industrial science and science in government."

Past editors

Abstracting and indexing 
Social Studies of Science is abstracted and indexed in Scopus and the Social Sciences Citation Index. According to the Journal Citation Reports, its impact factor is 4.038, ranking it 1st out of 111 journals in the category "History of Philosophy and Science".

References

External links 
 

SAGE Publishing academic journals
English-language journals
Publications established in 1971
Bimonthly journals
History of science journals
Science and technology studies journals
Philosophy of science journals